Lyudmila Litvinova (born June 8, 1985) is a Russian sprint athlete.

Litvinova won the silver medal in the 4 × 400 m Women's relay for Russia at the 2008 Beijing Summer Olympics.

External links

1985 births
Living people
Russian female sprinters
Olympic athletes of Russia
Athletes (track and field) at the 2008 Summer Olympics
Sportspeople from Lipetsk
World Athletics Championships medalists
Competitors stripped of Summer Olympics medals
Olympic female sprinters
21st-century Russian women